Rao Gari Intlo Rowdy is a 1990 Telugu-language action-drama film, produced by N. Sai Prasanna under the Ram Prasad Arts banner and directed by Kodi Ramakrishna. It stars Akkineni Nageswara Rao, Vanisri, Suman,Bhagyasri and music composed by Raj–Koti.

Plot
The film begins on Kotigadu (Suman) a ruffian, lives in a colony where everyone is scared of him except a charming girl Gowri (Rajani) who loves him. A trio Alexandra (Raja Krishna Murthy), Bujjulu (Kota Srinivasa Rao) & Periyyappa Devara (Sudharshan) misuse him as a weapon for their illegal activities. During that time, an ideal couple Anand Rao (Akkineni Nageswara Rao) & Vani (Vanisri) land into the colony where they try to reform Koti. Meanwhile, Koti gets a clash with the trio, so, they indict him in crime and sentences. But fortuitously, one night, he is released and taken to a bungalow where he views Anand Rao & Vani as a surprise. Now, Koti asks Anand Rao to give him a chance to eliminate his enemies then Anand Rao keeps a condition to stay with them for 10 days without any questions to which Koti agrees. Here, Koti slowly transforms with the acquaintance of Anand Rao's granddaughter Baby (Baby Sowmya Hamsa). After 10 days, Koti develops unknown affection on Baby and unable to leave her. But he moves forcibly when Baby pleads him with sorrow to get her parents. Angered, Koti inquires Anand Rao regarding Baby's parents then he affirms that the person behind their hardship is himself by showing Baby's parents photograph when Koti recollects the past. Actually, Anand Rao is a Public Prosecutor, who has sentenced the trio's children for molested a girl. To take avenge, they kidnapped Anand Rao's son-in-law through Koti, in that quarrel, his daughter lost her memory. Now Koti decides to save him and reaches the trio where they play a ball game to release their children. Koti lets them break out, in return, unfortunately, Anand Rao's daughter falls under their vehicle and retrieves her memory. Howbeit, Koti tries to help her, whereupon the trio's children escape. Immediately, Koti rushes, protects Anand Rao's son-in-law, ceases the baddies and surrenders himself to Police. At last, Koti is released with a short-term penalty. Finally, the movie ends on a happy note with the marriage of Koti & Gowri.

Cast

Akkineni Nageswara Rao as Anand Rao
Vanisri as Vani 
Suman as Kotigadu 
Bhagyasri as Shanti 
Rajani as Gowri 
Prabhakar Reddy  as I.G.
Kota Srinivasa Rao as Bujjulu
Raja Krishna Murthy as Alexander 
Sudarshan as Periyappa Devara
Brahmanandam as Inspector Kukuteswara Rao / Ram Prasad 
Babu Mohan as Broker Babu Rao 
Mallikarjuna Rao as Munni Swamy
Bhimeswara Rao as Judge 
Gadiraju Subba Rao
Anitha
Aruna as Saroja 
Baby Sowmya Hamsa as Baby

Soundtrack

Music composed by Raj–Koti. Lyrics were written by Jonnavithhula Ramalingeswara Rao. Music released on Cauvery Audio Company.

Other
 VCDs and DVDs on - SHALIMAR Video Company, Hyderabad

References

Indian action drama films
Films directed by Kodi Ramakrishna
Films scored by Raj–Koti
1990s action drama films
1990s Telugu-language films